The National Innovation Center (Nepali: राष्ट्रिय आविष्कार केन्द्र्, Rashtriya Abiskar Kendra) is a nonprofit organisation established on 9 November 2012 by Mahabir Pun. Tribhuwan University provided land for the purpose of establishing the center in 2019 and the infrastructre was constructed at a cost of NPR 8 crore.

Funding
Pun tried to secure fund for the Center till July 2016, but seeing no progress, he started crowd funding campaign which was a success. He was able to collect NPR 100 millions. Other plans to fund the Center according to Pun is to build a 10MW hydropower station. Mahabir also donated his own land to establish the National Innovation Center.

Objectives
Primary objective to establish the Innovatuion center according to Mahabir is to foster research and developments for the economic development of the country.

Founding Members
The founding members of the organization are:
 Dr. Mahabir Pun (Social Entrepreneur and Internet Hall of Fame inductee) 
 Mr. Rameshore Khanal (Economist and Former Secretary, Ministry of Finance)
 Dr. Dambar Nepali (Hydro Power expert)
 Dr. Pramod Dhakal (former scientist in Canada now with Open University Nepal)
 Dr. Dinesh Bhuju (Scientist, National Academy of Science and Technology) 
 Hari Kumar Silwal

Notable Projects
The center sponsors any projects with possibility to serve the community. Accorindg to Pun, academic qualification is not necessary to start projects at the center.
The center is working in about 20 projects.

Medical Drones
In collaboration with UNICEF, prototype drones capable of delivering medicines are under study. The design, fabrication and testing are done in Nepal locally. These drones have become successful to carry 1 kg for about 2 km as of 2018.

Sel Roti Machine
It is a project to make a machine for mass-production of traditional Nepali cuisine, Sel roti. The project was started by Abhisek Nakarmi and Krishna Deole.

Monkey Repellent System 
This project aims to make a device powered by solar energy that can sense and repels wild animals. It is inspired by the village where monkey destroyed crops every year. The device produces different types of sound to repel the animals.

COVID19 response (contribution)
The centre actively participated in COVID-19 assistance. 
 It distributed PPE freely to ambulance drivers and health workers.
 It developed and distributed swab collection booth freely to Bir Hospital, Teaching Hospital, Birendra Hospital, APF Hospital, Bhaktapur hospital, Teku Hospital and some hospitals in Butwal, Itahari, Surkhet, Baglung and Birgunj.
 It freely repaired ventilators of various hospitals.

Industrial Collaboration
The centre has collaborated with various commercial organizations. 
 It has worked with Chicken and fish farms in Chitwan District
 It is working in the field of tourism and agriculture in Biratnagar and Pokhara

References

External links
Current Projects
Official Website

Organisations based in Nepal
2012 establishments in Nepal